Michèle Arnaud (born Micheline Caré; 18 March 1919 – 30 March 1998), was a French singer, recording artist, and director. She was buried on 18 September 1998 at Montparnasse Cemetery. She is the mother of the singer Dominique Walter and the photographer Florence Gruère.

Arnaud was awarded a Chevalier de la Légion d'honneur and Ordre des Arts et des Lettres. She was the first entrant for Luxembourg in the first edition of the Eurovision Song Contest in 1956.

Biography 

After completing her primary education in Cherbourg, she went to Paris where she took a course at the Ecole Libre des Sciences Politiques. She gained two degrees in philosophy. Simultaneously with her studies, she regularly frequented cabaret clubs such as Le Tabou and La Rose Rouge.

In 1956 she was the first entrant for Luxembourg in the first edition of the Eurovision Song Contest in Lugano, participating with the songs Ne crois pas and Les amants de minuit.

On 11 July 1962, she appeared in the first-ever live television transmission via satellite from France to the United States.  Because of the orbital path of the newly launched American satellite, Telstar, the program lasted only twenty minutes.  Also appearing that evening was Yves Montand.

Discography

Compilations

Gainsbourg sung by... 
 2 CD EMI Music France 854067-2, 1996 and reedited in June 2006, all songs of Serge Gainsbourg sung by Michèle Arnaud (CD 1) :
La Recette de l'amour fou, 1958
Douze belles dans la peau, 1958
Jeunes femmes et vieux messieurs, 1958
La Femme des uns sous le corps des autres, 1958
Ronsard 58, lyrics by Serge Barthélémy and music by Serge Gainsbourg, 1959
Il était une oie, 1959
La Chanson de Prévert, 1961
Les Goémons, 1962
La Javanaise, 1963
Les Papillons noirs, a duo with Serge Gainsbourg, 1966
Ballade des oiseaux de croix, 1966
Les Papillons noirs, 1966
Ne dis rien, from the musical Anna, 1967
Rêves et caravelles, 1969

Michèle Arnaud 
 2 CD EMI Music France 520486-2 (1999)
 CD 1 :
Voulez-vous jouer avec moi ?, texts by Marcel Achard and music by Georges van Parys, 1956
Ne crois pas, texts and music by Christian Guitreau, 1956
La rue s'allume, texts by Louis Ducreux and music by André Popp – Louis Ducreux, 1955
Quand on s'est connu, texts and music by Jean-Pierre Moulin, 1958
L'Éloge des cocus, texts by Pierre Lambry and music by Simone Lorencin, 1957
Zon zon zon, texts by Maurice Vidalin and music by Jacques Datin, 1957
Sous le pont Mirabeau, poem by Guillaume Apollinaire and music by Jacques Lasry, 1955
Julie, texts by Maurice Vidalin and music by Jacques Datin, 1957
Sans l'amour de toi, paroles de Claude Delécluse and music by Michelle Senlis – Paul Misraki, 1957
Morte Fontaine, texts by Rolland Valade and music by Jean-Michel Arnaud, 1959
Van Gogh, texts by Pierre Lambry and music by Jacques Datin, 1959
Napoli, texts and music by Roger Riffard, 1960
Loulou de la Vache Noire, texts and music by Roger Riffard, 1960
Deux tourterelles, texts by Eddy Marnay and music by Emil Stern, 1957
Pourquoi mon dieu, French adaptation by Georges Moustaki et Jacques Kabanellis from Manos Hadjidakis, 1962
Pauvre Verlaine, texts and music by Salvatore Adamo, 1968
Amour perdu, texts and music by Salvatore Adamo, 1963
Toi qui marchais, texts by Jean-Pierre Chevrier and music by Guy Bontempelli, 1963
L'Inconnue, texts and music by Roger Riffard, 1960
Il y a des années, texts and music by Roger Riffard, 1960
 CD 2 :
Angelo, texts and music by Robert Ardray, 1964
Comment dire, texts and music by Guy Bontempelli, 1964
Et après ?, texts by Armand Seggian and music by Jacques Pezet, 1964
La Chanson de Tessa, texts by Jean Giraudoux and music by Maurice Jaubert, 1965
Ne vous mariez pas les filles, texts by Boris Vian and music by Alain Goraguer, 1964
Si les eaux de la mer, texts by Bernard Dimey and music by Henri Salvador, 1965
Les Papillons noirs, a duo with Serge Gainsbourg, texts and music by Serge Gainsbourg, 1966
Ballade des oiseaux de croix, texts and music by Serge Gainsbourg, 1966
Chanson sur une seule note, French adaptation by Eddy Marnay of Samba de una nota so from the Brazilian texts by Newton Mandonga, music by Antonio Carlos Jobim, 1962
Sans toi, texts by Agnès Varda and music by Michel Legrand from the movie Cléo from 5 to 7, 1963
Un soir, texts by Bernard Dimey and music by Henri Salvador, 1964
La Marche arrière, texts by Boris Vian and music by Henri Salvador, 1964
Je croyais, adaptation by Hugues Auffray and Georges Aber from Yesterday by John Lennon and Paul McCartney, 1966
La Grammaire et l'amour, texts and music by Guy Bontempelli, 1966
La Chabraque, texts by Marcel Aymé and music by Guy Béart, 1960
Marie d'Aquitaine, texts by René Ruet and music by André Grassi, 1962
Cherbourg avait raison, texts by Jacques Larue and Eddy Marnay, music by Guy Magenta, 1961
La Chanson des vieux amants, texts by Jacques Brel and music by Gérard Jouannest, 1967
Le Bleu de l'été, French adaptation by Henri Contet of Green leaves of summer from the American texts of Paul Francis Webster, music by Dimitri Tiomkin from the movie Alamo, 1961
Timoléon le jardinier, texts and music by Roger Riffard, 1960

References

Eurovision Song Contest entrants for Luxembourg
Eurovision Song Contest entrants of 1956
Musicians from Toulon
Chevaliers of the Légion d'honneur
Burials at Montparnasse Cemetery
1919 births
1998 deaths
20th-century French women singers